The Niter Ice Cave is a geological feature approximately 3 miles south of the small southeastern Idaho town of Grace, Idaho.

History 
The most probable explanation for the Niter Ice Cave is that thousands of years ago, a volcanic eruption formed a huge lava tube that eventually cooled to form this cave. Early settlers in the area found the cave to be a place to store their food and collect ice all year around. It has been a picnic spot and recreation site. There have been explicit drawings and graffiti on, around, and in the ice cave.

References

External links
Inside Niter Ice Cave 360 panoramas website, G. Donald Bain, 26 July 26, 2014, retrieved 17 January 2016.  
Enter the Niter Ice Cave Virtual Tour untraveledroad.com, not dated, retrieved 17 January 2016.
Niter Ice Cave Showcaves.com, Jochen Duckeck. undated, retrieved 17 January 2016.
Photos and info

Landforms of Caribou County, Idaho
Caves of Idaho
Lava tubes
Ice caves